Neomicrococcus is a genus of bacteria from the family Micrococcaceae.

References

Actinomycetota
Bacteria genera